Michael Joseph Piazza (born September 4, 1968) is an American former professional baseball catcher who played 16 seasons in Major League Baseball (MLB), from 1992 to 2007. He currently serves as the manager of the Italian national baseball team. He played most notably for the New York Mets and Los Angeles Dodgers, while also having brief stints with the Florida Marlins, San Diego Padres, and Oakland Athletics. A 12-time All-Star and 10-time Silver Slugger Award winner at catcher, Piazza produced strong offensive numbers at his position; in his career, he recorded 427 home runs—a record 396 of which were hit as catcher—along with a .308 batting average and 1,335 runs batted in (RBI).

Piazza was drafted by the Dodgers in the 1988 MLB draft as a favor from Tommy Lasorda to Piazza's father. He was the last player selected and signed in his draft class to play in the Major Leagues. Initially a first baseman, Piazza converted to catcher in the minor leagues at Lasorda's suggestion to improve his chances of being promoted. He made his major league debut in 1992 and the following year was named the National League (NL) Rookie of the Year and was an All-Star for the first of 10 consecutive seasons. Piazza immediately impressed with his ability to hit for power and average. His best year as a Dodger came in 1997 when he batted .362, hit 40 home runs, and had 124 RBI, leading to a runner-up finish in voting for the NL Most Valuable Player Award. In 1998, he was traded to the Marlins and then a week later to the Mets, with whom he spent most of the remainder of his career. He helped the Mets reach the 2000 World Series, the only World Series appearance of his career. After the 2005 season, Piazza left the Mets to play one season each for the Padres and Athletics before retiring after the 2007 season.

Piazza is regarded as one of the best offensive catchers in baseball history. He had at least one RBI in 15 straight games for the Mets in 2000, the second-longest RBI streak ever. In 2013, the Mets inducted Piazza into the New York Mets Hall of Fame. In 2016, Piazza was elected to the Baseball Hall of Fame, receiving 82.95% of the vote and wearing a Mets hat in his plaque. Piazza owned the Italian soccer team A.C. Reggiana 1919, which played for two seasons (2017–2018) in Serie C under his leadership before its non-registration due to continued financial troubles.

Childhood
Piazza was born in Norristown, Pennsylvania, grew up in Phoenixville, Pennsylvania, and attended Phoenixville Area High School. He is the second-oldest son of an Italian father named Vince (1932–2021) and a Slovak-Jewish mother named Veronica, with brothers Vince Jr., Dan, Tony, and Tom. His father was the son of Italian immigrants from Sciacca, Sicily. Tom's godfather was former MLB manager Tommy Lasorda. Mike grew up a Philadelphia Phillies fan, and admiring Hall of Fame third baseman Mike Schmidt. Vince Piazza earned a fortune of more than $100 million in used cars and real estate, and attempted several times to purchase an MLB franchise. When the Dodgers—managed by Vince's childhood friend Tommy Lasorda, the godfather of Mike Piazza's youngest brother, Tommy—visited Philadelphia, Piazza visited the Dodger clubhouse and served as a bat boy in the dugout.

Vince's own hopes of playing baseball had ended at the age of 16 when he left school to support his family. He saw that Piazza had potential in the sport, and began encouraging his son to build his arm strength at the age of five. When he was 16, Piazza received personal instruction in his backyard batting cage from Ted Williams. The Hall of Famer praised his talent, advised him not to let anyone change his swing, and autographed Piazza's copy of Williams' The Science of Hitting. Vince threw hundreds of pitches nightly to his son, who shared his father's focus on baseball, clearing snow if necessary to practice his hitting and, after reaching the major leagues, practicing on Christmas Eve. Piazza graduated from Phoenixville Area High School in 1986, after which he went to South Florida and joined the Miami Hurricanes his freshman year; receiving no playing time that season, Piazza transferred to Miami-Dade Community College.

Major league career

Los Angeles Dodgers
After his father asked Lasorda to select Piazza as a favor, the Miami-Dade Community College student was drafted by the Dodgers in the 62nd round of the 1988 MLB amateur draft as the 1,390th player picked overall. Lasorda asked Piazza to give up his first base position and learn how to catch to improve his chances of reaching the major leagues, and helped him attend a special training camp for catchers in the Dominican Republic. Piazza became an excellent hitter, especially for a catcher. His MLB debut came with the Dodgers on September 1, 1992, against the Chicago Cubs. He drew a walk in his first plate appearance and then doubled to deep center field in his first official at-bat, against Mike Harkey of the Cubs. He hit his first home run on September 12, 1992, against Steve Reed of the San Francisco Giants. He only appeared in 21 games that season, hitting .232.

Piazza won the NL Rookie of the Year Award in 1993 after appearing in 149 games, hitting .318, slugging 35 home runs, and driving in 112 RBI. He was also selected to the 1993 Major League Baseball All-Star Game, his first of 10 consecutive (and 12 total) All-Star appearances. Until Joc Pederson passed him in 2015, Piazza's 18 home runs before the All-Star break was a Dodgers' rookie record. In 1996, Piazza hit .336 with 36 home runs and 105 RBI, finishing second in NL MVP voting, behind Ken Caminiti. Piazza's best season with the Dodgers came in 1997, when he hit .362, with 40 home runs, 124 RBI, an on-base percentage of .431, and a slugging percentage of .638. He finished second in NL MVP voting for the second straight year, behind Larry Walker.

Florida Marlins

Piazza played seven seasons for the Dodgers until he was traded to the Florida Marlins on May 15, 1998, after an offseason in which Piazza wanted a new contract before being eligible for arbitration; he wanted $105 million for seven years while the Dodgers offered six years for $76 million. Piazza blasted the Dodgers when his demands were criticized by fans and the media, blaming Vin Scully in particular. Piazza and Todd Zeile went to the Marlins in return for Gary Sheffield, Charles Johnson, Bobby Bonilla, Manuel Barrios, and Jim Eisenreich. He only appeared in five games with the Marlins, where he hit .278.

New York Mets

One week later, on May 22, Piazza was traded from the Marlins to the New York Mets for Preston Wilson, Ed Yarnall, and Geoff Goetz. Despite an excellent performance from Piazza, the Mets missed the 1998 postseason by one game. Piazza helped the Mets to two consecutive playoff appearances in 1999 and 2000. In the former season, Piazza tied his career highs of 40 home runs and 124 RBIs. He also set the record for most home runs in a season without ever hitting more than one in a game, passing a mark previously set by Rogers Hornsby in 1929.

The following year, Piazza led the Mets to an NL pennant and a World Series appearance in the 2000 Subway Series. Of note, all five games were decided by two runs or fewer, something that had not occurred in a World Series in almost 70 years. He became known as the Monster after coach John Stearns was caught on tape during the 2000 National League Championship Series after a Piazza hit saying "The Monster is out of the Cage".

Piazza was involved in a bizarre incident during the 2000 World Series. Earlier in the season during interleague play, Yankees pitcher Roger Clemens hit Piazza in the head with a fastball. Piazza suffered a concussion and was forced to miss the 2000 MLB All-Star Game. Clemens was widely criticized by Mets fans for the incident, but Clemens maintained that the pitch was not intentional. Clemens and Piazza would go on to face each other again in the first inning of World Series Game 2. During the at-bat, Clemens threw a pitch that broke Piazza's bat as he fouled it off, sending the barrel and a sharp edge of the broken bat directly at Clemens on the mound just as he finished his delivery. Clemens caught the barrel, initially thinking it was the ball coming back at him, but upon realizing it was not the baseball, he threw it across the first base line towards the Yankees' dugout and just past Piazza who was running down to first. Piazza gave a long stare at Clemens and slowly started walking towards Clemens to confront him, and Clemens asked the umpire for a new ball as if nothing had happened. During replays, Clemens can be seen shouting "I thought it was the ball!" and asking the umpire for a new ball multiple times as the two benches cleared and met at the mound. Words were exchanged between the two players, but no punches were thrown from either team and nobody was ejected. Piazza later caught for Clemens when both were on the NL team in the 2004 All-Star Game. Clemens gave up six runs in the first inning.

Piazza's game-winning 8th-inning home run in the first professional baseball game played in New York following the 9/11 attacks has been called iconic, therapeutic, and symbolic. The jersey he wore in that September 21, 2001 game was purchased in April 2016 for $365,000, the highest price ever paid for a modern-day jersey, and is displayed on a rotating basis among the 9/11 Memorial Museum, Citi Field, and the National Baseball Hall of Fame.

To ease the stress on his deteriorating knees, Piazza began to split his time between catching and playing first base during the 2004 season, an experiment which was abandoned before the end of the season because of Piazza's defensive deficiencies.  Although recognized as a great hitter, Piazza has had some notable defensive accomplishments. Among them, Piazza caught two no-hitters thrown by Ramón Martínez and Hideo Nomo while playing with the Dodgers. Nomo's was particularly impressive because it happened at Coors Field, notorious for being a hitter-friendly ballpark. Additionally, Piazza's .997 fielding percentage was the highest among NL catchers in 2000.

On May 5, 2004, Piazza surpassed Carlton Fisk for most home runs by a catcher with his 352nd.

On October 2, 2005, Piazza played his final game in a Mets uniform. Because it was well-reported that Piazza would soon depart to free agency, Mets manager Willie Randolph elected to replace Piazza in the top of the eighth inning. With the Shea Stadium crowd giving him a standing ovation, Piazza humbly bowed to the stands and blew kisses to the adoring fans.

San Diego Padres

Following the 2005 season, Piazza signed a one-year contract with the San Diego Padres on January 29, 2006.

Serving as the Padres' starting catcher and clean-up hitter, Piazza experienced somewhat of a rejuvenation in 2006, batting .283 with 22 homers and helping the Padres to a division title. On July 21, 2006, Mike Piazza collected his 2,000th career hit in the major leagues.

On August 8, 2006, Piazza played his first game at Shea Stadium since leaving the Mets. Throughout the three-game series, Piazza drew frequent standing ovations from New York fans. It was on par with that of Tom Seaver on his return to pitch at Shea Stadium in 1977 and 1978. Even more telling was during that series, on August 9, he drew a rare curtain call in the opposing park following a home run off Mets pitcher (and former Dodgers and Mets teammate) Pedro Martínez in the 4th inning. Not done for the day, Piazza went deep off Martinez again in the 6th. With the Mets ahead 4–2 in the 8th, and two runners aboard, Piazza hit one to the wall in center, nearly bashing his third homer of the day and putting the Padres ahead.

Oakland Athletics
Piazza signed as a free agent with the Oakland Athletics on December 8, 2006.

On July 25, 2007, in the top of the ninth inning in a game between the Angels and Athletics at Angel Stadium, a fan threw a water bottle that hit Piazza, who had homered earlier in the game. Piazza then pointed his bat in the stands at the fan he believed threw the water bottle to get the attention of security. The fan, who was identified as Roland Flores from La Puente, California, was arrested by the ballpark security. Piazza pressed charges against Flores. Flores was sentenced to 30 days in jail and three years of probation on March 27, 2008. On September 26 against the Boston Red Sox at Fenway Park, Piazza hit his 427th and what would be his final major league home run of his career off of rookie pitcher Jon Lester.

After not being signed to any MLB team for the 2008 season, Piazza announced his retirement on May 20, 2008, saying, "After discussing my options with my wife, family and agent, I felt it is time to start a new chapter in my life. It has been an amazing journey."

Retirement
Piazza made a return to Shea Stadium during the "Shea Goodbye" closing ceremony on September 28, 2008, where he received the final pitch in the history of the stadium from Hall of Famer Tom Seaver. Piazza and Seaver also officially "closed" Shea when they walked off together into the center field exit and closed the door on the park after waving goodbye to the capacity crowd. On April 13, 2009, Piazza received the very first pitch in the new Citi Field from Seaver before the Mets' opening game against the Padres.

International baseball
Prior to the start of the 2006 MLB season, Piazza represented Italy in the 2006 World Baseball Classic.

Piazza was the Italian National Baseball team's hitting coach at the 2009 and 2013 World Baseball Classic. He was an instructor for the Italian Baseball Academy when it won back-to-back European Baseball Championships in 2010 and 2012.

On Nov. 13, 2019, Piazza announced that he would manage the Italian National Baseball team in the 2020 European Baseball Championship and the 2021 World Baseball Classic. Due to the coronavirus pandemic and cancellation of the 2020 European Baseball Club competitions, Piazza was unable to do so.

Reggiana
In 2016, Piazza purchased a majority ownership stake of the third-division Italian soccer club A.C. Reggiana in Reggio Emilia, with an estimated investment of $3 million. His interest grew from his friendship with former Italian soccer player Maurizio Franzone.

However, after two seasons of ownership and a controversial playoff loss to Robur Siena (with a penalty called in the 96th minute) Piazza put the team up for sale. Finding no buyers, and faced with mounting costs, including rent, the club ceased operations in July 2018. In December 2018 the team declared bankruptcy for the third time in twenty years. Piazza and his wife had feuded with Luca Vecchi, then mayor of Reggio Emilia, during their time as owners of the club.

Legacy

In a sixteen-year major league career, Piazza played in 1,912 games, accumulating 2,127 hits in 6,911 at bats for a .308 career batting average along with 427 home runs, 1,335 runs batted in, an on-base plus slugging percentage of .922 and an on-base percentage of .377. Piazza is one of the best-hitting catchers of all time, hitting 427 career home runs, 396 of them while he was playing the catcher position, a Major League Baseball record for career home runs by a catcher. Only eight other players have ever had over 400 home runs with over a .300 lifetime average while never striking out more than 100 times in a season (Ted Williams, Stan Musial, Lou Gehrig, Mel Ott, Hank Aaron, Babe Ruth, Vladimir Guerrero and Chipper Jones). He is one of only three players in history to win ten Silver Slugger Awards, along with Barry Bonds and Alex Rodriguez.

In addition to his hitting, Piazza's defense has undergone a more positive reassessment in light of new defensive metrics. His pitch framing, in particular, ranks seventh-best among all catchers going back to the first data in 1988. Another report published in 2008 put him third among all catchers since 1948 in improving the performances of his pitchers.

Mets teammate Tom Glavine called Piazza a "first-ballot Hall of Famer, certainly the best hitting catcher of our era and arguably the best hitting catcher of all time". On May 8, 2010, while receiving an award, Piazza said to reporters that if he got into the Hall of Fame, he would like to be inducted as a Met, for whom he played seven-plus seasons.

Piazza managed the USA team in the 2011 futures game wearing a Mets cap to the event.

On January 9, 2013, Piazza failed to be elected to Baseball Hall of Fame, receiving only 57.8% of the votes and falling short of the 75% qualifying votes. He stated that he would address the performance-enhancing drugs and steroid rumors in his book Long Shot. In his second appearance on the ballot, Piazza's percentage numbers did rise (62.2%), but not to the 75% needed to be inducted. Piazza again failed to make the Hall of Fame in 2015, receiving 69.9% of the votes needed (28 votes shy of the mark). On January 6, 2016, Piazza was elected to the Baseball Hall of Fame, receiving 83% of the vote.

Piazza was inducted into the New York Mets Hall of Fame on September 29, 2013. The New York Mets retired his uniform number, 31, in a ceremony on July 30, 2016 prior to the Mets' game against the Colorado Rockies at Citi Field.

A triangular pennant bearing Piazza's surname and uniform number is in the background of character Peter Parker's bedroom in the 2019 film Spider-Man: Far From Home. The song 'Piazza, New York Catcher' by Scottish rock band Belle & Sebastian is about Piazza. Piazza's autobiography, entitled Long Shot, was released in February 2013.

Acting
Piazza has appeared in the movie Two Weeks Notice and has acted in various TV shows and commercials. During the 1994–95 MLB strike, Piazza and a handful of other striking players appeared as themselves in the November 27, 1994 episode of Married... with Children.

On May 3, 2013, Piazza debuted with the Miami City Ballet, saying a few lines in the role of a hit man in the troupe's production of Slaughter on Tenth Avenue. Piazza wants to increase the reputation of ballet among sports fans as a result of his daughters' attendance at a ballet school.

In 2023, Piazza appeared on the Fox reality challenge series Special Forces: World's Toughest Test.

Personal life
On January 29, 2005, Piazza married Playboy Playmate Alicia Rickter at St. Jude's Catholic Church in Miami, Florida, before 120 guests, including Brande Roderick, Lisa Dergan, Anjelica Bridges, Al Leiter, John Franco, Iván Rodríguez, Eddie Trunk, and his best friend Eric Karros.

On February 3, 2007, Piazza's wife gave birth to the couple's first child, daughter Nicoletta. On August 3, 2009, their second child, daughter Paulina, was born. The couple's third child and first son, Marco, was born in July 2013.

Piazza is known to be a fan of heavy metal music and is featured on the album Stronger than Death by Black Label Society. He is also godfather to Zakk Wylde's son, Hendrix. He often cohosts Eddie Trunk's Friday Night Rocks show on WAXQ ("Q-104.3 FM") in New York City and was featured as the primary guest on an episode of That Metal Show. He is also an accomplished drummer and has performed on stage with various bands.

Piazza is a devout Roman Catholic. His faith was instilled in him by his Catholic mother and was featured in Champions of Faith, a DVD documentary exploring the intersection of Catholic religious faith and sports. He also appeared in the follow-up video Champions of Faith: Bases of Life. His mother was raised Jewish, but converted to Catholicism after marrying Piazza's father.

Piazza is also avidly involved in the National Italian American Sports Hall of Fame in Chicago.

While playing with the Mets, Piazza was a resident of Cresskill, New Jersey. He also maintained a penthouse apartment on 18th Street in New York City.

See also

 List of Major League Baseball home run records
 List of Major League Baseball career hits leaders
 List of Major League Baseball career home run leaders
 List of Major League Baseball career intentional bases on balls leaders
 List of Major League Baseball career OPS leaders
 List of Major League Baseball career putouts as a catcher leaders
 List of Major League Baseball career runs batted in leaders
 List of Major League Baseball career runs scored leaders
 List of Major League Baseball career slugging percentage leaders
 List of Major League Baseball individual streaks
 List of members of the Baseball Hall of Fame
 Los Angeles Dodgers award winners and league leaders
 Mike Piazza's Strike Zone
 New York Mets award winners and league leaders

References

External links

 
 Article from New York magazine, October 2000, about Piazza and the Mets
 HardRadio.com interview with Piazza about his passion for Heavy Metal music

1968 births
2006 World Baseball Classic players
Águilas de Mexicali players
American expatriate baseball players in Mexico
Albuquerque Dukes players
Baseball coaches from Pennsylvania
Catholics from Pennsylvania
American people of Italian descent
American people of Slovak descent
Bakersfield Dodgers players
Baseball players from Philadelphia
Florida Marlins players
Living people
Los Angeles Dodgers players
Major League Baseball All-Star Game MVPs
Major League Baseball catchers
Major League Baseball players with retired numbers
Major League Baseball Rookie of the Year Award winners
Miami Dade Sharks baseball players
National Baseball Hall of Fame inductees
National League All-Stars
New York Mets players
Norfolk Tides players
Oakland Athletics players
People from Cresskill, New Jersey
People from Montgomery County, Pennsylvania
Sacramento River Cats players
Salem Dodgers players
San Antonio Missions players
San Diego Padres players
Silver Slugger Award winners
St. Lucie Mets players
Stockton Ports players
Vero Beach Dodgers players
People of Sicilian descent
Jewish American sportspeople
Jewish Major League Baseball players